The women's featherweight is a competition featured at the 2013 World Taekwondo Championships, and was held at the Exhibition Center of Puebla in Puebla, Mexico on July 20. Featherweights were limited to a maximum of 57 kilograms in body mass.

Medalists

Results
DQ — Won by disqualification
W — Won by withdrawal

Finals

Top half

Section 1

Section 2

Bottom half

Section 3

Section 4

References
Entry List
Draw
Results
Results Book Pages 723–770

women's 57
Worl